A number of steamships have been named Seiko Maru, including:

, 
, 108 GRT
, 3,099 GRT
, 371 GRT
, 240 GRT
, 164 GRT
, 5,385 GRT

Ship names